Shalamcheh is an Iranian surface-to-air missile claimed to be capable of destroying several sorts of modern fighter jets and drones. This missile is launched from the Mersad domestic air defense system.

Shalamcheh is considered as a medium-range missile which can also be utilized as a short-range missile. It travels at the speed of Mach 3, is resistant to enemy electronic warfare, and its average range is 40 kilometres.

Military tests 
On 5 May 2014, the army of Iran successfully test-fired Shalamcheh missile, where it shot down the Iranian domestic drone Karrar.

In November 2018, air defense drills were held in the central, northern and western parts of Iran.

References 

Post–Cold War weapons of Iran
Surface-to-air missiles of Iran